XHRED-FM is a radio station on 88.1 FM in Mexico City. XHRED-FM is owned by Grupo Radio Centro and broadcasts a combined format of news/talk and English classic hits known as Universal (or Universal Stereo, the format's name between 1991 and 2014). XHRED-FM also broadcasts via the HD Radio over-the-air broadcast service for compatible home and car stereos.

History

Radio Red 
Radio Central de México, S.A., the operator and concessionaire of XERED-AM, first received a concession to operate an FM radio station in Mexico City in 1972. XHRED-FM then launched in 1976 picking up a format previously heard on 1560 AM: "Radio VIP" with a mix of programming and music primarily in English. Further, in the 1980s, Spanish-language newscasts were added with the title Monitor, airing simultaneously with sister station XERED-AM. For some time in the early 1990s, the station's callsign was changed to XHVIP-FM in reference to its then-name.

In 1995, Radiodifusión Red—which, by this point, had grown to include XERED-AM, XHRED-FM, and XHRCA-FM 91.3 in Mexico City, as well as Radio Red repeaters in Guadalajara and Monterrey (XEDKR-AM 700 and XESTN-AM 1540)—was sold off to Grupo Radio Centro. At this time 88.1 finally adopted the "Radio Red FM" name. The station continued to air the Monitor newscasts, now produced by Gutiérrez Vivó's company Infored, alongside contemporary music in English and a nightly program focused on jazz, which ended in 2001. For media concentration reasons, Radio Centro sold two stations (1320 AM, which became XENET-AM, and 1560 AM, which became XEINFO-AM) to Infored in 1998, with the stations being relaunched in 2000. Later in the decade, Grupo Radio Centro and "Monitor" newscast producer Infored subsequently had a falling out, which resulted in the end of the Monitor newscasts on Radio Red after 30 years in 2004. Radio Centro responded by increasing XHRED-FM's effective radiated power to 95 kW and expanding its own in-house and self-produced news offerings. In April 2013, the station dropped the "Radio" prefix from its name and was known simply as "Red FM".

Universal 88.1
On May 16, 2016, Red FM and Universal 92.1 swapped radio frequencies. Despite the name change, the station's callsign remains unchanged, and XERED-AM was still broadcast over its HD Radio subchannel until XERED-AM went off the air in January 2019. The Universal English classic hits format was created in 1974 on XEQR-FM. From April 9 to December 7, 2018, a morning newscast called "Sin anestesia" ("No Anesthesia") hosted by newscaster Carlos Loret de Mola was broadcast on the station, causing controversy among listeners and subsequently lower ratings than its programming the year before. The newscast ended as Loret de Mola couldn't reach an agreement with GRC to continue when GRC opted to consolidate its talk programming on a relaunched XERC-FM, which would have required the show to move to a new timeslot.

La Octava

As part of the launch of Radio Centro's TV station, XHFAMX-TDT, on October 31, 2019, Universal moved to XERC-FM and all the talk programming moved back to XHRED, which took the same "La Octava" (The Eighth) name as the TV station.
Not all programming on La Octava radio was a TV simulcast.

Beginning February 10, 2020, the station added contemporary music in Spanish and English during non-news hours following the cancellation of several programs and the elimination of looped newscast reruns. On May 23, following XERC-FM's sale to MVS Radio, GRC announced that the Universal format would return to XHRED, sharing airtime with three of La Octava's newscasts on weekdays beginning June 1. To compensate for the Universal radio format no longer being fully musical, a new Internet audio streaming portal known as "Universal Stereo Online" was launched on the same day, with a 24-hour music stream.

External links
Grupo Radio Centro Website
Universal Website
La Octava

References

Radio stations established in 1976
Radio stations in Mexico City
Grupo Radio Centro